Part of a Bronze Age settlement was uncovered at Must Farm quarry, at Whittlesey, near Peterborough, in Cambridgeshire, England. The site has been described as "Britain's Pompeii" due to its relatively good condition, including the "best-preserved Bronze Age dwellings ever found" there, which all appear to have been abandoned suddenly following a catastrophic fire. Research now suggests that the site was less than one year old at the time of destruction.

Must Farm was named Best Archaeological Project and Best Archaeological Discovery at the 2012 British Archaeological Awards, and Best Discovery at the 2016  Awards. An article describing the settlement won the Antiquity Prize 2020.

Early excavations
Wooden posts were first recognised at the site in 1999, leading to preliminary excavations in 2004 and 2006. Early finds at the site include a rapier and a sword in 1969. Between 2011 and 2012, eight Bronze Age log boats were discovered. The boats were found in a small freshwater palaeochannel and were preserved due to waterlogging.

Radiocarbon dating has indicated that the ages of these boats spanned a period of about 1,000 years, with the earliest examples dating to around 1750–1650 BCE. Some of the boats may have been deliberately sunk. They are now preserved at Flag Fen and are available to view on guided tours.

Bronze Age woven wooden fish traps and wattle-hurdle fish weirs were found in the same channel, together with metalwork including swords and spears.

2015/2016 excavation

In September 2015, the University of Cambridge's Cambridge Archaeological Unit began a dig, eventually covering , the details of which were publicly disclosed in January 2016.

Historic England funded a £1.1 million project to excavate the site to gain as much knowledge of Bronze Age life in Britain as possible. Archaeologists found two roundhouses, from about 1000–800 BCE, and concluded that they were damaged by fire and that the platform on which they sat then slid into the river, where the fire was extinguished and the buildings and objects within them were preserved in the silt. About half of the settlement is thought to have been lost due to modern-day quarrying.

Objects recovered include pots still containing food, textiles woven from lime tree bark and other plant fibres, sections of wattle walls, and glass beads.

The specimen, dating from 1,100 to 800 years BCE, represents the most complete and earliest of its type found in Britain. The wheel's hub is also present. A horse's spine found nearby suggests the wheel may have been part of a horse-drawn cart. The find "expands our understanding of late Bronze Age technology", said Duncan Wilson, chief executive of Historic England, which was co-funding the project. , the archaeology had been removed and the site reburied to be left sealed.

In 2019 researchers at Cambridge and Bristol universities revealed the results of a study of human and dog coprolites found at the site. They discovered the presence of fish tapeworms, echinostoma worms, capillaria worms and giant kidney worms. The research shows the earliest evidence of human infection by these parasites in Britain.

The dig was the subject of a BBC Television documentary, Britain's Pompeii: A Village Lost in Time, first broadcast on BBC Four on 2 August 2016. The excavation became known for its extensive digital outreach.

Artefacts

These artefacts from Must Farm were photographed at Peterborough Museum in July 2017:

References

External links

Podcast about the site by Dan Snow (MP3, 4m 31s, 6.3Mb)
Frequently updated Twitter feed
British Broadcasting Corporation: Britain's Pompeii: A Village Lost in Time
The use of social media at Must Farm

2015 in England
Bronze Age sites in Cambridgeshire
History of the University of Cambridge